The Board of Secondary Education, Andhra Pradesh abbreviated BSEAP also known as Directorate of Government Examinations, Andhra Pradesh. It was established in 1953 and functions as an autonomous body under the Andhra Pradesh's Department of Education.

The board regulates and supervises the system of Secondary Education in Andhra Pradesh State. It executes and governs various activities that include devising of courses of study, prescribing syllabus, conducting examinations, granting recognitions to schools and, providing direction, support and leadership for all secondary educational institutions under its jurisdiction.

Andhra Pradesh Board Examinations 
DGE's office conducts SSC/OSSC examinations twice in a year. One is the Main examination in March month and another is Supplementary
Examinations May / June months.

See also 
Andhra Pradesh Board of Intermediate Education

References 

1953 establishments in India
State agencies of Andhra Pradesh
Education in Andhra Pradesh
State secondary education boards of India
Organisations based in Vijayawada